Alaguilac may refer to:
 Alaguilac people, a historic ethnic group of Central America
 Alaguilac language, their language